Benedict Dos Santos (born 2 May 1998) is a German professional footballer of Congolese descent who plays as a midfielder for Sonnenhof Großaspach.

References

1998 births
German sportspeople of Democratic Republic of the Congo descent
People from Wertheim am Main
Sportspeople from Stuttgart (region)
Footballers from Baden-Württemberg
Living people
German footballers
Association football midfielders
VfB Stuttgart II players
SV Waldhof Mannheim players
FC Gießen players
SG Sonnenhof Großaspach players
3. Liga players
Regionalliga players
Oberliga (football) players